Blastic phase chronic myelogenous leukemia is a phase of chronic myelogenous leukemia in which more than 30% of the cells in the blood or bone marrow are blast cells (immature blood cells). When tiredness, fever, and an enlarged spleen occur during the blastic phase, it is called blast crisis.

See also
 List of hematologic conditions

References

 Blastic phase chronic myelogenous leukemia entry in the public domain NCI Dictionary of Cancer Terms

Chronic myeloid leukemia